Northfleet Green is a hamlet in the borough of Gravesham in Kent, England. It is located around two miles southwest of Gravesend and just east of Southfleet in the neighbouring borough of Dartford. The High Speed 1 railway line passes just to the north of the hamlet. The population of the hamlet is included in the ward of Istead Rise.

Villages in Kent